Freedom: The Regine Velasquez-Alcasid Digital Concert was a livestream concert by Filipina recording artist Regine Velasquez. The concert was produced and broadcast by ABC-CBN Events through four live streaming platforms at 8:00p.m. (PST) on February 28, 2021. Velasquez arranged for the livestream in order to perform material from a variety of music genres and create a live experience on a stream that she had never done before. The set list included renditions of songs from artists such as Elton John, Chris Isaak, George Michael, Sara Bareilles, Dua Lipa, and Billie Eilish. Bamboo Mañalac performed as a special guest.

Freedom was filmed live at ABS-CBN Studios in Manila, set up with musicians, background vocalists, and dancers. It was initially planned to be held on Valentine’s Day, but was rescheduled due to a potential COVID-19 exposure amongst the production team and following strict isolation and quarantine guidelines. The concert received generally positive reviews, many of which praised Velasquez's stage presence and performance. Commercially, the show was also successful with ticket sales exceeding million  within twelve hours after they were made available for purchase. A reshowing of the livestream was broadcast exclusively via Stageit on April 4, 2021.

Background and development
The development of Freedom began after Regine Velasquez curated online benefit concerts in support of relief efforts during the COVID-19 pandemic. In April 2020, she performed One Night with Regine to benefit the Bantay Bata Foundation's COVID-19 response fund. Two months later, she collaborated with Jollibee Foods Corporation on Regine: Joy From Home, which raised money in support of the brand's food aid program. The virtual concert was officially announced on December 15, 2020, through ABS-CBNnews.com and Velasquez's social media accounts. A promotional poster was released along with the announcement of the venture showing a portrait of Velasquez's head shot in grayscale. Within ten minutes after it was made available for purchase, KTX.ph reported that ticket sales grossed , with all VIP tickets sold after twelve hours, by which time it had exceeded million . Additional VIP tickets were sold because of high demand.

Velasquez stated that the concert's name and concept were based on her desire to have "freedom of singing" anything she wants. She asserted that she wanted to perform new material from a variety of music genres and step out of her comfort zone. She explained that she wanted to put together a show with more involvement and creative control on all of the different elements of the production. She further said that she felt unable to surprise her audience anymore because they had set the bar so high for her. Velasquez additionally thought her fans were longing for some sort of human connection during lockdown protocols associated with the COVID-19 pandemic.

The show was stated to have a total of 20 production numbers and a running time of two hours by The Philippine Star, which noted that it was one of the singer's "biggest online concerts". Velasquez was heavily involved in planning and production, and said that her main objective was to deliver performances of songs from various music eras "with an exciting twist". She claimed that working on the project fueled her artistic growth and maturity. In the venue, a full concert set up was made, with live musicians, background vocalists, and dancers. Raul Mitra served as the music director, while Paolo Valenciano was chosen as the stage director. On February 9, 2021, Velasquez and her team announced through their social media accounts that Freedom was postponed due to a COVID-19 exposure within the production team. As a precaution to prevent any unexpected circumstances, she underwent self-quarantine following guidance on isolation and social restrictions. Five days later, after a confirmed negative COVID-19 test from the singer, it was announced that the concert would be rescheduled to February 28 at 8:00p.m. (PST). The show was broadcast on additional platforms via iWantTFC, TFC IPTV, and Sky Pay-per-view. Freedom was made available to stream again on Stageit at 10:00a.m. (PST) on April 4, 2021.

Concert synopsis

VIP-ticket holders got to experience exclusive behind the scenes footage from Freedom's rehearsals. The concert opened with a short video introduction narrated by Velasquez. The set featured a large LED screen as a backdrop and geometric structures of birds hanging from the ceiling. The performance began with Velasquez, in a red dress with long cape, making her way to an elevated platform to perform George Michael's  "Freedom!" She then descended the podium and goes straight into her rendition of Sara Bareilles's "Brave", as she is accompanied by female dancers performing a lyrical dance routine. The singer continued into a slower number, an a capella cover of Billie Eilish's "When the Party's Over", before transitioning into Chris Isaak's "Wicked Game". Velasquez then sang an English and stripped-down version of  group Twice's hit "Heart Shaker". She made her way next to the piano and began her rendition of Elton John's "Goodbye Yellow Brick Road".

The second act saw Velasquez changing outfits into a black lace bodysuit, and beginning a performance of Dua Lipa's "Levitating" with her dancers while doing a choreography. She then put on a long coat and proceeded to sing her songs "Bukas Sana" and "Tanging Mahal". Velasquez followed this with performances of tracks from Filipino bands: The Juans's "Istorya" and Ben&Ben's "Leaves". The third act began with Bamboo Mañalac making his way to the stage for a performance of "Masaya", before Velasquez, in a white silk suit, joined him for a duet number of "Himala". Shortly after, she started Adele's "Rolling in the Deep" that interpolated Linkin Park's "In the End". Following the performance, she spoke briefly about the 2021 documentary film Framing Britney Spears, which she saw while under quarantine, and expressed her hopes for Spears's freedom from her conservatorship. She then paid tribute to the American singer with a ballad rendition of her debut hit "...Baby One More Time". She ended the segment with a holographic duet with herself singing "On the Wings of Love".

For the final act, Velasquez donned a yellow off-the-shoulder dress and began with Bob Dylan's "Make You Feel My Love" and Madonna's "Crazy for You", which she dedicated to her son and husband. Patti Austin's "I Will Remember You" was performed for an in memoriam segment, paying tribute to individuals in the industry, including those who had died from COVID-19. Joined by her female dancers, she started a medley of songs that had gone viral on the online video platform TikTok. Freedom closed with an encore performance of Tears for Fears's "Mad World". VIP-ticket guests also got to attend a virtual meet-and-greet and after party.

Critical reception
Freedom was met with generally positive reviews from critics. A review by the Philippine Entertainment Portal considered the show's production and vocal performances a benchmark against which other Philippine online concerts could be measured. It further remarked that Velasquez was "in her element" as she performed unforgettable and appealing songs one after another. Bea Cupin from Rappler commended the show for being "surprisingly intimate and edgy". She complimented the singer's relaxed demeanor and sense of humor albeit performing in a virtual setting, saying, "If it was awkward at all for the singer, whose career has been defined by sold-out shows, to be surrounded only by her team, that certainly didn’t show." She concluded, "The music icon outdoes herself with an online concert that fans both old and new are sure to remember for years to come." A music critic from the Manila Standard agreed with Cupin in terms of the show's "intimate yet explosive live performance", and lauded the renditions of songs that "bared Regine's beautiful range and exceptional artistry".

Set list
This set list is adapted from ABS-CBNnews.com, and from the streaming concert itself.

 "Freedom!"
 "Brave"
 "When the Party's Over"
 "Wicked Game"
 "Heart Shaker"
 "Goodbye Yellow Brick Road"
 "Levitating"
 "Bukas Sana"
 "Tanging Mahal"
 "Istorya"
 "Leaves"
 "Masaya" / "Himala" 
 "Rolling in the Deep" / "In the End"
 "...Baby One More Time"
 "On the Wings of Love"
 "Make You Feel My Love"
 "Crazy for You"
 "I Will Remember You"
 "Upside Down" / "All I Want" / "Mad at Disney"
Encore
 "Mad World"

See also
 List of Regine Velasquez live performances

References

External links
 Tours of Regine Velasquez at Live Nation

Regine Velasquez concert tours
2020 concert tours
Livestreams